Summer Solstice is a 1981 American made-for-television romantic drama film directed by Ralph Rosenblum, written by Bill Phillips and starring Henry Fonda (in his final acting performance) and Myrna Loy.

Plot
Henry Fonda and Myrna Loy star as Joshua and Margaret Turner, an aging couple visiting the beach where they met 50 years earlier.

Cast

References

External links
 
 

1981 television films
1981 films
American drama television films
Films directed by Ralph Rosenblum
Films shot in Massachusetts
American films based on plays
ABC Motion Pictures films
HBO
1980s American films